Stiles is an unincorporated community and census-designated place (CDP) in Whitehall Township in Lehigh County, Pennsylvania. As of the 2010 census, the population was 1,113.  

It is part of the Lehigh Valley, which had a population of 861,899 and was the 68th most populous metropolitan area in the U.S. as of the 2020 census. It uses the Whitehall Township ZIP Code of 18052.

Geography
Stiles is in eastern Lehigh County in central Whitehall Township. It is bordered to the east by the borough of Coplay and to the south by unincorporated Hokendauqua. Pennsylvania Route 145 passes just west of Stiles, leading south  to the center of Allentown and north  to Walnutport. Coplay Creek forms the western boundary of Stiles and flows southeast into the Lehigh River.

References

Census-designated places in Lehigh County, Pennsylvania
Census-designated places in Pennsylvania